The Chief of National Intelligence (CNI) is the Sri Lankan government official in-charge of directing and overseeing the intelligence agencies in Sri Lanka. Created in 2006, reporting to the Permanent Secretary to the Ministry of Defence, CNI is a member of the National Security Council of Sri Lanka, coordinating the work of intelligence agencies in the country.

Chief of National Intelligence (2006–present) 
Major General Kapila Hendawitharana 
Sisira Mendis (retired DIG)
Major General Jeewaka Ruwan Kulatunga
Major General Jagath Alwis

See also 
Sri Lankan intelligence agencies
Director of National Intelligence

References 

 
Government agencies established in 2006
Sri Lankan intelligence agencies
Sri Lanka